Olga Mikhaylova (born December 7, 1986) is a race walker from Russia.

Achievements

External links 

1986 births
Living people
Russian female racewalkers
Universiade medalists in athletics (track and field)
Universiade gold medalists for Russia
Medalists at the 2009 Summer Universiade
21st-century Russian women